Etxabarri Ibiña (also in) is a hamlet and concejo located in the municipality of Zigoitia, in Álava province, Basque Country, Spain. The Gorbeia shopping mall is located in the hamlet, it mainly serves the nearby city of Vitoria-Gasteiz.

References

External links
 

Concejos in Zigoitia